Aloma of the South Seas is a lost 1926 American silent comedy drama film starring Gilda Gray as an erotic dancer, filmed in Puerto Rico and Bermuda, and based on a 1925 play of the same title by John B. Hymer and LeRoy Clemens.

The film was spoofed by a 1926 Mutt and Jeff animated cartoon, Aroma of the South Seas.

Plot
Bob Holden (Percy Marmont), an embittered World War I veteran, has gone to the South Seas to drown in drink the memory of his old girlfriend, Sylvia (Julanne Johnston) who has married his best friend, Van Templeton (William Powell) in his absence.  This happened only because Templeton withheld word from Sylvia that Holden had survived the war.  In the South Seas, Holden becomes the object of Aloma’s (Gilda Gray) loving and ministering attentions and eventually promises to marry her. Naturally, Nuitane (Warner Baxter), Aloma’s abandoned Polynesian boyfriend is jealous.  The plot gets thicker when Templeton and Sylvia arrive on the island rather inexplicably. Templeton tries to force himself upon Aloma but is foiled by Holden. The jilted Nuitane decides to feed Holden to the sharks, but suddenly realizes that Templeton is the extra man in the love pentagon.  As Templeton is devoured, Nuitane calmly observes: “Sharks not eat Nuitane—sharks like white meat.” Minus the evil interloper, the two couples fall happily into a race-appropriate (for that era) clinch.

Cast

Release
The film premiered at Paramount's Rialto Theatre in New York City on May 16, 1926. Grossing $3 million in the U.S. alone, this was the most successful film of 1926 and the fourth most successful film of the 1920s.

Preservation

The film is now considered to be a lost film.

Remake
The film was remade as Aloma of the South Seas (1941), starring Dorothy Lamour and Jon Hall. The plot was completely reworked, leaving only the setting in common with the earlier film.

See also
 List of lost films

References

External links 

Swedish poster featuring Gilda Gray

Lobby card at silenthollywood.com

1926 films
American black-and-white films
American silent feature films
Lost American films
Lost comedy-drama films
Famous Players-Lasky films
Films directed by Maurice Tourneur
Films shot in Puerto Rico
Films set in Oceania
1920s English-language films
1926 comedy-drama films
1926 lost films
1920s American films
Silent American comedy-drama films